Ira B. Tucker (May 17, 1925June 24, 2008) was the lead singer with the American gospel group The Dixie Hummingbirds. He was with The Dixie Hummingbirds for 70 years, from 1938, when he joined at the age of 13, until his death from cardiovascular disease on June 24, 2008. Ira is the father of Sundray Tucker, Ira Tucker Jr., and Lynda Laurence, formerly of The Supremes.

Tucker – whose middle initial "stood for nothing" – was born in Spartanburg, South Carolina, and died in Philadelphia.

References

External links

CMT.com : Ira Tucker

1925 births
2008 deaths
American gospel singers
20th-century American singers
Musicians from Spartanburg, South Carolina